Jangaon is a town and the district headquarters of Jangaon district in the Indian state of Telangana. It is also the mandal and divisional headquarters of Jangaon Mandal and Jangaon revenue division respectively. It lies on the National Highway 163

Geography 

Etymology 
The name Jangaon evolved from "jain gaon", which means "village of Jains", a religion of India.

History 

Jain Thirthankara sculptures that were found in the excavations near the town revealed the existence of Jainism in the Megalithic age.

Jangaon was the second capital region of the Kalyani Chalukyas in the 11th century. One of the most acclaimed Telugu poets of all time Bammera Pothana was born in the village of Bammera in Jangoan in 1450 AD. After the demise of the Nayaks 50-years rule, this region came under the Kakatiya dynasty from 1195 to 1323, before being annexed to the Delhi Sultanate under Tughlaq rule. The region was part of the Bahmani Sultanate and then the Sultanate of Golconda Qutb Shahi dynasty in 1512. The Mughal emperor Aurangzeb conquered Golconda in 1687 and it remained part of the Mughal empire. Qamar-ud-din Khan Asaf Jah I declared sovereignty in 1724 and established the Asaf Jahi Dynasty.

In 1854 the Jangaon area was under the administrative region of Bhonagheer Circars. Jangaon is mentioned as Zungaon in an 1854 map. In 1866 new districts were created; all Circars were delimited and merged. Bhonagheer, Davercondah and Nelgoondah Circars merged to form Nalgonda District but the Jangaon area was transferred from Bhongir Circar to Warangal District in 1866, Cherial was renamed Taluka by adding some parts of Wardannapet region, with its headquarters at Jangaon.

In 1905 the  Princely state of Hyderabad was sub-divided into four divisions; Aurangabad Division, Gulbarga Division, Gulshanabad Division and Warangal Division. Districts were delimited in 1905; Jangaon (Cherial), Taluka and Kodar (Kodad). Taluka was transferred to Nalgonda District from Warangal district.  Hyderabad State was annexed to the Dominion of India by operation polo in 1948, and became an Indian state. In 1948 Jangaon taluka was part of Nalgonda district in Gulshanabad Division of Hyderabad State.

In 1953, there was a shuffling of areas, shifting some villages from one taluka to the other. Subsequently, when Warangal district was divided to facilitate administrative control and on 1 October 1953, Khammam district was formed. Khammam, Yellandu, Madhira, Burugunpahad and Palavancha talukas have been made part of it. Warangal, Mulugu, Mahabubabad, Pakala (Narsampet) remained in Warangal district. But again Parkaala from Karimnagar district and Jangaon taluka from Nalgonda district have become part of Warangal district living back Nalgonda, Miryalguda, Deverkonda, Bhongir, Ramannapet, Suryapet, and Huzurnagar to Nalgonda district. After these changes in 1953, few villages of Jangaon taluka went to Medak district and some remained in Nalgonda district.

During the reign of Marri Chenna Reddy in 1979, Jangaon taluka was split into Cherial, Kodakandla and Jangaon talukas, at that time Jangaon taluk consist of 7 Circles namely Jangaon, Cherial, Rebarthi, Narmetta, Ippaguda, Chennur and Kodakondla Cirles. In 1985, when N. T. Rama Rao introduced the mandal system, Jangaon taluka was further divided in to Jangaon Mandal, Raghunathpalle, Lingalaghanpur and Devaruppula mandals.

On 11 October 2016  Jangaon was made the district headquarters, along with 21 newly formed districts in Telangana. Warangal district was divided into five district: Warangal Urban district (now Hanamkonda district), Warangal Rural district (now Warangal district), Jangaon district, Jayashankar district and Mahabubabad district. Jangaon district was formed mostly from the old Jangaon Revenue division, with the exception of Maddur, Cherial and Komuravelli mandals, which were transferred to newly formed Siddipet district, Ghanpur and Zaffergadh from Warangal  Revenue division and Gundala of Nalgonda district were merged with Jangaon district.

Demographics

Aler, Cheriyal, and Kolanpak were under Jangaon taluka before they were transferred to other districts.

, the census of India, the city had a population of 52,394 with 12,276 households. The total population consists of 26,764 males and 25,630 females—a sex ratio of 958 females per 1,000 males. 5,123 children are in the age group of 0–6 years, of which 7,347 are boys and 6,993 are girls—a ratio of 952 per 1,000. The average literacy rate was 82.39% with 38,948 literates.

Religion
86.08% of the population were Hindu and (11.55%) were Muslim. Other religious minorities included  Christians (1.83%), Sikhs (0.23%), Buddhists (0.02%) and those of no stated religion (0.27%).

Language
Speaker based on Mother Tongue in Jangaon Town are 86% Telugu, 11.5 Urdu, 0.3 Marathi, 0.2 Punjabi, 0.4 other Languages.

Climate 
Jangaon experiences a tropical climate. According to the Geological survey, the area is drought-prone and experiences very hot summers, moderate winters and less than the average precipitation.

The climate in Jangaon is referred to as a local steppe climate.
There is little annual rainfall; the climate here is classified as BSh by the Köppen-Geiger system.

Governance

Civic administration 
Jangaon Municipality is the civic body that oversees the civic needs of the town. It was constituted in 1953 as a third grade municipality. It was upgraded to second grade in the year 2010 with 28 municipal wards.

Law and order 
The West Zone Deputy Commissioner of Police Warangal is responsible for maintaining law and order in the town and district areas. Jangaon has Senior Civil Judge's Court, and Prl. Junior Civil Judge's Court for maintaining law and order.

Healthcare 

The 100-bed Government Area Hospital Jangaon is the largest hospital in the town. A new Medical college was sanctioned to the Jangaon District and will be upgrading the existing hospital in the district by the state government and admissions will be started from 2023.

Culture 

Kolanupaka temple, a religious destination for the Jains.

Jeedikalllu Sri Ramachandra Swamy Devasthanam is a famous Temple that predates Bhadrachalam temple. Jeedikalllu village is located about 15 km southerly to the district centre, Jangaon.

Nearest Cities 
West (NH163)

Hyderabad 92 km

South (NH365B)

Suryapet 88 km

East (NH163)

Warangal 60 km

North (NH365B)

Siddipet 60 km

Transport

Public transport 

The TSRTC has a bus depot in the town and provides public transport.

Roadways 

Jangaon has road and rail connectivity. National Highway 163, connecting Hyderabad and Bhopalpatnam Road, passes through the town. A new national highway NH 365B connects Jangaon with different district headquarters of the state Suryapet-Jangaon-Siddipet-Siricilla.

Railway 

Jangaon railway station provides rail connectivity to the town and is under the jurisdiction of the Secunderabad railway division of South Central Railway zone. It was constructed by Nizam's Guaranteed State Railway in 1879. This railway line connects Hyderabad with Warangal, and was later extended to Bezawada. Falaknuma–Jangaon MEMU is a suburban train that connects the town with the state capital.

Education 

The town has 38,948 literates; 21,722 males, 17,226 females and a literacy rate of 82.39%. The primary and secondary school education is run by government and private schools under the School Education Department of the state, assisted by State Institute of Educational Technology. The municipal limits of the town has a total of 14 government and 38 private schools.

The Higher Education Department of the state oversees the undergraduate and postgraduate education. The town has four government and fifteen private run colleges. This includes TSSW Boys Residential Junior College, a social welfare college; 5 private unaided colleges and a co-operative junior college. There exists one residential college under TSRJC, ten privately aided colleges, and two co-operative colleges. A.B.V.Government Degree College is an autonomous college that is affiliated with Kakatiya University and approved under the Universities Grant Commission scheme.

See also 
 List of towns in India by population

References 

Jangaon district
Cities and towns in Jangaon district